M-70 was a state trunkline highway in the US state of Michigan. In the 1920s, the highway originally connected Sterling in southwest Arenac County with Prescott in southeast Ogemaw County. The route was later adjusted to run from M-76 near Sterling along a convoluted route through Maple Ridge and Prescott to end at M-55 in Nester's Corners. The highway was still a gravel road when the designation was removed by 1960.

Route description
The final route used by M-70 followed Melita Road starting at M-76 northwest of Sterling. The highway ran north and crossed the Rifle River at a point between sections of the Ogemaw State Forest. The highway turned east on Main Street Road in Melita. From there, M-70 ran east on Main Street Road to the junction with Reed Road where it turned northward to Maple Ridge Road. The highway followed Maple Ridge Road east into Maple Ridge and turned north on Briggs Road. Crossing the Ogemaw–Arenac county line, the road name changed to Sage Lake Road into the village of Prescott. From there, it turned westerly on Greenwood Road through downtown Prescott, and north on Clark Road to end at M-55 one mile (1.6 km) west of Nester Corners, which is the intersection of South Sage Lake Road and M-55.

History
M-70 was first shown on a state map on July 1, 1919, with the debut of the Michigan state trunkline highway system. The original routing was shown between M-76 at Sterling and M-55 at Prescott. In 1929, M-55 was shifted to run due east from Selkirk to US Highway 23 north of Whittemore. The segment east of Prescott  to Whittemore was turned over to the county, but the section north of Prescott was added to M-70. This extended M-70 north to its terminus in Nester's Corners. The designation was decommissioned by July 1, 1960. At the time, the highway was still a gravel road.

Major intersections

See also

References

External links

Former M-70 at Michigan Highways

070
Transportation in Arenac County, Michigan
Transportation in Ogemaw County, Michigan